The 2006 Sandwell Metropolitan Borough Council election took place on 4 May 2006 to elect members of Sandwell Metropolitan Borough Council in the West Midlands, England. One third of the council was up for election and the Labour Party stayed in overall control of the council.

After the election, the composition of the council was:
Labour 50
Conservative 11
Liberal Democrat 5
British National Party 4
Independent 2

Campaign
24 of the 72 seats on the council were being contested in the election, with Labour holding control beforehand with 53 seats.

The election saw 9 candidates from the British National Party, part of a record number for the party in the West Midlands.

In the run up to the election councillor Alan Burkitt was arrested by the police on suspicion of selling his girlfriend for sex. As a result, Burkitt, representing Charlemont with Grove Vale ward, was suspended from the Conservative Party; Burkitt had previously been a Liberal Democrat councillor before defecting to the Conservatives.

During the election the Conservative candidate in Tipton Green Shahzad Chaudhry accused the Labour councillor, Ahmadul Haque, of breaking the code of conduct for candidates by giving his home number for voters who wanted help with postal votes, however Haque denied he had done anything wrong. Meanwhile, Chaudhry received the backing of the former British National Party organiser for the West Midlands, Steve Edwards, in the election for Tipton Green.

Election result
The results saw the British National Party win 3 seats, all gains from Labour. The gains for the British National Party came in the wards of Great Bridge, Princes End and Tividale, taking the party to 4 seats on the council. Labour dropped to 50 seats, after losing 4 but gaining another 1, the Conservatives stayed on 11 seats, the Liberal Democrats 5 and independents on 2 seats.

Ward results

References

2006 English local elections
2006
2000s in the West Midlands (county)